 
ACFD may refer to:

 Arlington County Fire Department, the fire department for Arlington County, Virginia
 Alameda County Fire Department, the fire department for Alameda County, California